One Road is the debut album by first-season New Zealand Idol winner Ben Lummis, released in New Zealand on 16 June 2004.

Chart and single information

Chart
One Road debuted on the official New Zealand albums chart at number 1 and held the position for two consecutive weeks. To date it has sold 45,000 copies and has been certified 3xplatinum by the RIANZ.

Singles
Ben's New Zealand Idol winner's song, "They Can't Take That Away", was the only single released from the album, immediately after he won the contest on 10 May 2004. It debuted at number 1 on the official New Zealand singles chart, a position that it held for seven weeks. The single was certified 4xplatinum by the RIANZ (40,000 copies sold). "I Love You, Love Me" was planned as the second single from the album, and although Ben made a music video for the song, the single was never released. Shortly after this he was dropped by Sony BMG.

Track listing
"I Love You, Love Me"
"One More Time (With Feeling)"
"They Can't Take That Away"
"Fool for Love"
"Easier to Leave"
"It's All Good"
"Searchin'"
"Alright With Me"
"Not Like This"
"Never Say I Love You"
"Only One Road"
"Kiss from a Rose"

Ben Lummis albums
2004 debut albums